Samuel Walker McGowan (born 4 January 1829 in Derry, Ireland - died 18 April 1887 Melbourne, Victoria, Australia) was a scientist and public servant who oversaw the creation of the first electrical telegraph line in the Southern Hemisphere. That first telegraph line in Australia ran from Melbourne to Williamstown.

Legacy

In 1872, Mount McGowan was named by Charles Todd after his Victorian counterpart, while surveying the Overland Telegraph Line. After his untimely passing in 1887, his former staff commissioned a stained glass window in his parish church, the Holy Trinity Anglican Church, Balaclava with plaque inscribed "In memory of Samuel Walker McGowan, Deputy Postmaster General of Victoria, one of the vestry of this parish . . . " In 1982, McGowan Place, Dickson, Canberra was named in his memory.

See also
 Postmaster-General's Department

Further reading
 Wikibooks contributors. History of wireless telegraphy and broadcasting in Australia, Biographies, Samuel Walker McGowan (Wikibooks, The Free Textbook Project) 
 Wikibooks contributors. History of wireless telegraphy and broadcasting in Australia, Biographies, William Philip Bechervaise (Wikibooks, The Free Textbook Project)

References

1829 births
1887 deaths
Public servants of Victoria (Australia)